Rakvere is a town in northern Estonia and the administrative centre of the Lääne-Viru maakond (county), 20 km south of the Gulf of Finland of the Baltic Sea. Rakvere is the 8th most populous urban area in Estonia. Rakvere has a total area of 10.75 square kilometres, and although about 15% of Rakvere is covered by forest, it is still the country's third most densely populated urban area. From the 13th century until the early 20th century, Rakvere was more widely known by its historical German name, Wesenberg(h).

History
The earliest signs of human settlement dating back to the 3rd–5th centuries AD have been found on the present theatre hill. Probably to protect that settlement, a wooden stronghold was built on the present-day Vallimägi. Soon after the kingdom of Denmark had conquered northern Estonia, in 1220, the new rulers started to erect stone buildings. A settlement called Tarvanpea was first mentioned in the Chronicle of Henry of Livonia in 1226. The new Danish stronghold got the first recorded mention as Wesenbergh (in Middle Low German) for the first time in 1252. The battle of Wesenberg between the Danish and Teutonic knights and local militia on one side and the forces of Novgorod and Pskov on the other occurred near Rakvere on 18 February 1268.

On 12 June 1302, Rakvere was granted Lübeck rights. When the Danish king sold Danish Estonia to the Livonian Order in 1346, a large castle was built on top of the previous stronghold. The Ordensburg was protected by towers and courtyards. The building of a Franciscan monastery was started in 1508.

During the wars of the 16th century, Rakvere was in 1558 captured by Muscovite troops and heavily damaged after the disastrous Siege of Wesenberg (1574) by Sweden. Sweden captured the town in 1581 before it passed to the Polish–Lithuanian Commonwealth in 1602; Polish troops destroyed the castle in 1605. After being returned to Swedish control in that year, a mansion was built on the ruins of the monastery. During the Great Northern War, Rakvere was burned down in 1703. With the Capitulation of Estonia and Livonia in 1710 and the subsequent Treaty of Nystad in 1721, Rakvere passed to the Russian Empire, where it remained until Estonia become an independent nation in 1918 following World War I.

During the first period of Estonian independence in 1918-1940, many prominent buildings were built in Rakvere, including the market building, the old bank building (current SEB Eesti Ühispank), and Rakvere Gymnasium. In 1930, the town stadium was opened, during the tenure of mayor Heinrich Aviksoo. Local newspapers started to emerge, including the county paper Virumaa Teataja, which was first published in 1925. The idea of Rakvere's own professional theatre started to take shape as well. The construction of the theatre house was completed at the end of the 1930s and its festive opening was on 24 February 1940. The theatre survived World War II and is active to this day.

Rakvere also has a professional theatre which is one of smaller, if not the smallest, town in Europe with its own professional theatre. Its roots date back to 1882 and it is still active and very popular. The theatre of Rakvere has given Estonia many renowned actors and actresses: Volli Käro, Üllar Saaremäe, Indrek Saar, Ülle Lichtfeldt, Aarne Üksküla, and others. It also holds the biannual event Baltoscandal, which gathers avant-garde plays and groups from all over the world.

On 15 July 2000, a high-end F2/T5 tornado hit the town, killing one person and injuring one other. The tornado damaged 110 homes and destroyed 120 garage buildings. One car was even airborne.

Transport 
The Rakvere–Pärnu highway starts in Rakvere. To the north of the city is the Tallinn-Narva highway that is part of the European route E20.

The Tallinn-Narva railway passes the city. Long-distance transport connections from Rakvere include bus and train transportation. By bus and train one can travel to several destinations around Estonia. Train transportation is operated by Elron.

Religion

Main landmarks

Rakvere Castle 
The oldest known archeological traces of the ancient fortress on Rakvere's Vallimäe hill date from the 5th-6th century. Throughout the ages, Rakvere castle has belonged to Danish kings, knight-monks of the Livonian Order and the Swedish and Polish states. During the Polish-Swedish War of 1600-1629, the castle was partly blown up by the Polish troops in 1605, and later also by the Swedish army. The castle has lain in ruins ever since.

Today there is a theme park in the castle representing the everyday life of the 16th century.

Tarvas statue

Rakvere is also known now for its Tarvas statue of an aurochs, which was made by the Estonian sculptor Tauno Kangro. It is thought to be the largest animal statue in the Baltic region. It is situated on the edge of Vallimägi hill and was erected for the town's 700th birthday. Along with the granite block it sits on, the statue is seven meters long and four meters high and weighs about seven tons. The statue is made out of bronze. The names of the companies and private people who financed it are engraved in the granite block.

Rakvere Central Square 
Rakvere central square got a new modern look in 2004. It is a beautiful place to sit down for a moment and observe city life. This is the city's representative square. In the spring-summer period, the central square delights with gorgeous flower arrangements and a cooling fountain. During the winter, the square is decorated with various winter and Christmas installations. There is also the sculpture Young man on bicycle listening to music dedicated to Arvo Pärt, an honorary citizen of Rakvere.

Next to the central square is a historical market building and one of the most representative bank buildings in Estonia designed by Ferdinand Gustav Adoff. The square is surrounded by a shopping center, shops, pharmacies, restaurants, cafes, banks, and the Tourist Information Center.

Rakvere Trinity church
The Lutheran church of Rakvere, the Trinity church, originally dates from the 15th century and was designed to also be able to function as a stronghold in times of trouble. It was severely damaged during the Livonian War and renovation started only in 1684. During the Great Northern War, the church once more was damaged by fire twice. Renovations were carried out 1727–1730, and again during the middle of the 19th century, when the church received its present look, dominated by its neo-Gothic spire. The interior displays some fine craftsmanship, including a Baroque pulpit from 1690 made by Christian Ackermann.

Pikk street 
This is oldest street in Rakvere. In the 19th and first half of the 20th century, Pikk Street was the main shopping street in Rakvere, where the bank, shops, restaurants, and guesthouses were located. In 2020, Pikk Street was reconstructed to the extent of approximately 700 meters, as a result, the street became a modern pedestrian-friendly promenade and at the same time again a representative street of the city. Walking along the historic Pikk Street, you can get an overview of the diverse architecture of the city, where creative activities and several handicraft shops are concentrated, where you can find genuine Estonian handicrafts, souvenirs, folk costumes, and consumer goods. Here is also one of the strangest stairs in Estonia - the so-called Carrot Staircase, which leads to the Vallimägi viewing platform. The viewing platform offers a view in two directions - the city and the castle.

Twin towns - sister cities

Rakvere is twinned with:

Cēsis, Latvia
Lappeenranta, Finland
Lapua, Finland
Lütjenburg, Germany
Sigtuna, Sweden
Panevėžys, Lithuania
Senaki, Georgia
Szolnok, Hungary
Vyshhorod, Ukraine

Sports

Sports clubs 
 Basketball
 Rakvere Tarvas – a men's basketball team, Estonian second best basketball club in season 2009/2010. In season 2019/2020 they were 4th. The club takes part in Paf Estonian Latvian basketball league. This is the best basketball league in Estonia. The home ground is Kastani Arena.
 Volleyball
 BMF/Rakvere VK – a men's volleyball team, multiple Estonian Champion and Cup winner. Now the club takes part in Esiliiga. This is second best volleyball league in Estonia.
 Football
 Rakvere JK Tarvas – an amateur football club established in 2004. The club plays in Estonian II liiga (fourth tier in Estonian football). In 2016 they played in Estonian premium league. The home ground is Rakvere linnastaadion.

Sports events 
 Amateur Sumo World Championships 2008
 U19 EURO2012

Gallery

References

External links

 
 Things to see in Rakvere
 Photos of Rakvere in the night by Kaiko Lipsmäe 
 Population of Rakvere by mother tongue in 1897
 Rakvere stronghold picture gallery at Remains.se

 
Populated places established in the 3rd century
Populated places in Lääne-Viru County
Castles of the Livonian Order
Kreis Wierland
Cities and towns in Estonia
Municipalities of Estonia